Nitish V. Thakor (koli) (born 1952) is an American biomedical engineer and is a professor of
Biomedical Engineering at the Johns Hopkins University, a professor of Electrical and Computer Engineering, and a professor of Neurology at the Johns Hopkins University. 
He is also the director of the Singapore Institute for Neurotechnology (SINAPSE) at the National University of Singapore. Thakor is a leading researcher in Neuroengineering, having pioneered technologies for brain monitoring to prosthetic arms and neuroprostheses.

Biography 
Thakor graduated from the Indian Institute of Technology in Bombay. Thakor joined the Johns Hopkins Biomedical Engineering department in 1983.  In 2012 he was invited to lead the Singapore Institute for Neurotechnology. Thakor has authored more than 360 refereed journal papers (h-index 68; i10-index 313 as of November 2017)

References 

1952 births
Living people
Johns Hopkins Biomedical Engineering faculty
American bioinformaticians
IIT Bombay alumni
Indian emigrants to the United States